Pillar of Fire can refer to:

 Pillar of fire (theophany), a manifestation of God in the Tanakh
 Pillar of Fire International, a Methodist Christian denomination
 Pillar of Fire (novel) by Judith Tarr
 Pillar of Fire (film) the English title of Amud Ha'Esh a 1959 Israeli film
 Pillar of Fire (documentary), mini series on the history of Zionism and Israel
 Pillar of Fire: America in the King Years, 1963–65, the second volume of Taylor Branch's trilogy on Martin Luther King, Jr.
 Pillar of Fire and Other Plays by Ray Bradbury
 A short story included in the anthology S Is for Space
 Pillar of Fire (ballet) by Antony Tudor
 Pillar of Fire (sculpture), an outdoor sculpture in Washington, D.C.
 A sculpture of stylized flames by Egon Weiner at the site of origin of the Great Chicago Fire of 1871
 The Pillar of Fire, an 1899 French short silent trick film

See also
 Tactical High Energy Laser, formerly known as Pillar of Fire project
 A Column of Fire, a novel by Ken Follett